Lac Megantic may refer to:
 Lac Mégantic or Lake Mégantic, a lake in Quebec near its border with Maine
 Lac-Mégantic, Quebec, a town on the shores of the lake, at the lake's outlet to the Chaudière River
 Lac-Mégantic rail disaster, a 2013 train derailment, fire and explosion in the town

See also
 Megantic (disambiguation)